Manoel Beckman, also known as Bequimão, was a 17th-century trader, politician and farmer in Saint Louis of France, Maranhão in the North East of Brazil. He was son of a German father and a Portuguese mother, both of Jewish origin. He was investigated by the Portuguese Inquisition. In 1684, together with his brother Tomás and many rich farmers, he started a rebellion against the local colonial authorities and the Company of Commerce because of unfulfilled promises of shipments of African slaves and the abolition of native slavery. He also targeted the Catholic clergy, especially the Crown's Favourites, who protected the Christian natives. The insurrection was eventually put down by Loyalist troops and Beckman was hanged on November 2 1685.

References 

Brazilian people of German-Jewish descent
Brazilian people of Portuguese-Jewish descent
People from São Luís, Maranhão
1686 deaths
Year of birth missing
Brazilian Jews